Justice Little may refer to:

Philip Francis Little (1824–1897), chief justice of the Supreme Court of Newfoundland
William A. Little (Georgia judge) (1838–1924), associate justice of the Supreme Court of Georgia
William A. Little (Nebraska judge) (c. 1832–1867), associate justice of the Nebraska Supreme Court